Brain Injury is a monthly, peer-reviewed, medical journal published by Taylor & Francis.  Furthermore, it is the official journal of the International Brain Injury Association (IBIA). The chief editors are Jeffrey Kreutzer (Virginia Commonwealth University) and Nathan Zasler (University of Virginia).

This journal was published quarterly, beginning in July, 1987 to 1995. From 1996 to at least 2003 it was published monthly. The current frequency of publication is 14 times per year.

Aims and scope
This journal covers all topics of research and clinical practice, pertaining to brain damage in adult and pediatric populations. More specifically, the range of coverage includes fundamental research, clinical studies, brain injury translational medicine, as well as emergency room practices, acute medical delivery, rehabilitation through various phases, family issues, vocational concerns, and long-term support. Disorders that are psychological, functional, communicative, or neurological are covered from the perspective of assessment and intervention.

Abstracting and indexing
This journal is indexed in the following databases:

BIOSIS previews
CSA Linguistics & Language Behavior Abstracts
CINAHL
Current Contents / Clinical Medicine
EBSCO
Excerpta Medica / EMBASE
Index Medicus / MEDLINE
Neuroscience Citation Index
PsycINFO
Research Alert
Science Citation Index
Scopus
Sociological Abstracts
 
According to Ulrich's Periodicals Directory, it is indexed in Scopus, MEDLINE, PubMed, Biological Abstracts, PsycINFO, and other indexing and abstracting services. According to the 2010 Journal Citation Reports the 2014 impact factor is 1.808, and the ranking for this journal is 181 of 230 in the Neurosciences.

References

External links 
 
 International Brain Injury Association

Publications established in 1987
Neurology journals
Taylor & Francis academic journals
English-language journals
Journals published between 13 and 25 times per year